Boulevard Park is a historic residential neighborhood in  Sacramento, California. It is also the Boulevard Park Historic District, listed on the National Register of Historic Places.

Location
This neighborhood's official borders are: E Street to the north; J Street to the south; 16th Street to the west; and 24th Street to the east.

History 
The new subdivision of Boulevard Park, the second subdivision after Oak Park but the first within city limits, was originally formed on what was previously the old state fairgrounds and its racetrack. It was in 1905 that the land was sold to developers who converted the fairgrounds and divided the land into three subsections.

After World War II, many original homeowners of the subdivision sold their homes and moved into newer suburbs, altering the atmosphere of the neighborhood as some of the new landlords used the homes as boarding houses. Urban renewal in the 1970s reclaimed the Boulevard Park area and homes were restored to their former architectural glory. Many are Historic district contributing properties.

Today, the subdivision consists of about 300 buildings and it is the largest neighborhood in Sacramento on the National Register of Historic Places.

Schools
Elementary: Washington Elementary School, 520 18th Street

Government
Boulevard Park is represented by the following government districts:
 Sacramento City Council: Sacramento City District 3
 Sacramento County Board of Supervisors: Sacramento County District 1
 California State Legislature: 9th Assembly District; 6th Senate District
 United States House of Representatives: .

See also
History of Sacramento, California
National Register of Historic Places listings in Sacramento County, California
California Historical Landmarks in Sacramento County, California
Index: Historic districts in California

References 

Boulevard Park
Boulevard Park
National Register of Historic Places in Sacramento, California